LightningPaint was a monochrome, black + white bitmap graphics editor for the Apple Macintosh series of personal computers. Written in Lightspeed C, the program was similar to MacPaint, but distributed as shareware long after Apple stopped bundling MacPaint with new computers.

References

External links
 LightningPaint page at an archive of old Mac graphic software

Classic Mac OS software
Macintosh-only software
Macintosh graphics software
Raster graphics editors
Discontinued software
1991 software